The 1981–82 Yorkshire Football League season was the 56th and last season in the history of the Yorkshire Football League, a football competition in England.

At the end of the season the league merged with Midland Football League and formed the new Northern Counties East Football League. Most of the Yorkshire League clubs were transferred to the Northern Counties East League divisions.

Division One

Division One featured 12 clubs which competed in the previous season, along with four new clubs, promoted from Division Two:
Farsley Celtic
Lincoln United
Ossett Albion
York Railway Institute

League table

Map

Division Two

Division Two featured ten clubs which competed in the previous season, along with six new clubs.
Clubs relegated from Division One:
Bridlington Town
Kiveton Park
Maltby Miners Welfare
Clubs promoted from Division Three:
Bradley Rangers
Grimethorpe Miners Welfare
Harrogate Town

League table

Map

Division Three

Division Three featured 12 clubs which competed in the previous season, along with three new clubs.
Clubs relegated from Division Two:
Rawmarsh Welfare
Thorne Colliery
Plus:
Phoenix Park, joined from the West Riding County League

League table

Map

References

Yorkshire Football League
8